Fern is an English topographic name from the Old English ‘’fearn’’. It refers to someone who lives among ferns. The name is used as a given name and a surname.  The name is in use primarily in English-speaking countries. It has been in use since the 1800s and has also occasionally been in use for boys, though it is primarily a feminine name.  There were 133 newborn American girls named Fern in 2020 and 140 in 2021.

Notable people with the name Fern or Ferns include:

Given name
 Fern Andra (1893–1974), American actress
 Fern Battaglia (1931–2001), American baseball player
 Fern Bell (1913–2000), American baseball player
 Fern Brady (born 1986), Scottish comedian
 Fern Britton (born 1957), English television presenter
 Fern G. Z. Carr (born 1956), Canadian poet 
 Fern Schumer Chapman (born 1954), American journalist
 Fern Coppedge (1883–1951), American painter
 Fern Cunningham, American sculptor
 Fern Deacon (born 1998), English actress
 Fern Emmett (1896–1946), American film actress
 Fern Ferguson, American baseball player
 Fern Fitzgerald (born 1947), American actress
 Fern Gauthier (1919–1992), Canadian ice hockey player
 Fern Headley (1901–1956), American ice hockey player
 Fern Hobbs (1883–1964), American attorney
 Fern Holland (1970–2004), American lawyer
 Fern Hunt (born 1948), American mathematician
 Fern Jones (born 1923), American gospel singer
 Fern Kinney (born 1949), American singer
 Fern Kupfer (born 1946), American author
 Fern LeBlanc (born 1956), French professional ice hockey player
 Fern Majeau (1916–1966), French ice hockey player
 Fern Mallis (born 1948), American consultant
 Fern Michaels (born 1933), American author
 Fern Hubbard Orme (born 1903), American politician
 Fern Perreault (born 1927), French ice hockey player
 Fern Persons (1910–2012), American film actress
 Fern Rahmel (1914–2009), Canadian writer
 Fern Riddell (born 1986), British historian
 Fern Rivard (1946–1993), Canadian ice hockey player
 Fern Flanagan Saddler (born 1955), American judge
 Fern Sawyer (1917–1993), American cowgirl
 Fern Shaffer (born 1944), American painter
 Fern Shubert, Republican political figure
 Fern Shumate (1910–2003), American writer
 Fern Shollenberger (1923–1977), American baseball player
 Fern M. Smith (born 1933), American judge
 Fern Blodgett Sunde (1918–1991), Canadian wireless radio operator
 Fern Sutherland (born 1987), New Zealand actress
 Fern Villeneuve (1927–2019), Canadian aviator
 Fern Whelan (born 1988), English footballer

Stage name
 Fern (rapper) (born 1979), Puerto Rican rapper

Surname
 Charlie Fern, American speechwriter and journalist
 Cody Fern, Australian actor, screenwriter 
 Fanny Fern, pseudonym of American writer Sara Willis Parton
 Fritzi Fern, motion picture actress from Akron, Ohio
 George Fern, English footballer
 Harold Fern, British president of swimming's world governing body FINA
 Henry Ferne, Chaplain Extraordinary to Charles I
 Joseph J. Fern, first Mayor of Honolulu
 Rodney Fern (1948–2018), English footballer
 Ronald Ferns, English illustrator, designer, cartoonist and surrealist painter
 Tan Paey Fern, Singaporean table tennis player
 Tom Fern, English footballer

Fictional characters
 Fern Arable, from E.B. White's Charlotte's Web
 Fern the Green Fairy, one of The Rainbow Fairies from the Rainbow Magic book franchise
 Fern Martin from the film The Hard Man
 Fern Mayo/Vylette from Jawbreaker, 1998 black comedy film
 Fern Walters, from the children's book and animated television series Arthur
 Fern, from Magical × Miracle
 Fearne Calloway, from Critical Role Season 3.
 Fern, from the animated series Adventure Time

References 

English feminine given names
Given names derived from plants or flowers
Surnames of Old English origin